SS Athenic was a British passenger liner built by Harland & Wolff shipyards for the White Star Line in 1901. In 1928, she came to a Norwegian company and was renamed SS Pelagos. Torpedoed in 1944, she was refloated the following year and continued to serve until her demolition in 1962.

History
The 12,234-ton steamship Athenic was built at the Harland & Wolff shipyard in Belfast and launched on 17 August 1901. Athenic was the first of three identical sister ships which were built for the profitable freight and passenger service from London to Wellington, New Zealand. They were the first orders of the White Star Line after its takeover by J. P. Morgan's International Mercantile Marine Company (IMMC). On 13 February 1902, she sailed from London on her maiden voyage to Wellington via the Canary Islands, Cape Town and Hobart. She remained on the New Zealand route until the outbreak of World War II.

Her passenger capacity was 121 first class, 117 second class and 450 third class. She was equipped with electric lighting and cooling chambers for transport of frozen meat, specifically lamb.

When war was declared between the United Kingdom and Germany in August 1914, Athenic was in Wellington, New Zealand, and was requisitioned as a troopship under the British Liner Requisition Scheme. On 23 September 1914 she was in Lyttleton (Christchurch) in the South Island of New Zealand, where as one of the transports carrying what was known collectively as the "Main Body", she took on board the following units of the New Zealand Expeditionary Force: Headquarters, Mounted Rifles Brigade, the Canterbury Mounted Rifles Regt. (2 squadrons) and the Canterbury Infantry Battalion (less 1 Company). The Officer Commanding Troops was Colonel A.H. Russell. In total Athenic carried 54 officers, 1,259 men and 339 horses. She proceeded to Wellington and berthed there till 16 October 1914, when it was judged safe to depart. She sailed across the globe, sailing per convoy by way of Hobart, Albany, Colombo, Aden and finally arriving in Alexandria to disembark the soldiers on 3 December 1914. SS Athenic was designated at that time as being (His Majesty's New Zealand Transport) HMNZT 11. She was the largest troopship ever sent from New Zealand transporting New Zealand forces to the Middle East. Athenic acted several other times as a transport throughout World War I, with a new number for each voyage she undertook.

References
Ship Description from The Ships List
Athenic-class ocean liners at ssMaritime.com
Athenic records at Auckland War Memorial Museum
Details of Athenics service as a New Zealand transport throughout WWI From NZ Transport Ships at the Flotilla Australia website.

External links
Several interior images of Athenic

 

1901 ships
Passenger ships of the United Kingdom
Ships built in Belfast
Ships of the White Star Line
Steamships of the United Kingdom
Ships built by Harland and Wolff
Captured ships